The Alliance is an automobile that was made from 1904 to 1905 by Automobil- und Motorwerke Alliance Fischer & Abele, Berlin. They were powered by either 2- or 4-cylinder engines. Chassis and engines made by the company were often supplied to other factories as proprietary components.

References
Hans-Otto Neubauer, "Alliance (ii)", in G.N. Georgano, ed., The Complete Encyclopedia of Motorcars 1885-1968  (New York: E.P. Dutton and Co., 1974), pp. 36.

Brass Era vehicles
Defunct motor vehicle manufacturers of Germany